Distephanus is a genus of flowering plants in the family Asteraceae. It is described by American botanist Harold E. Robinson as having over 40 species  and by David Mabberley as having only 34 species. These sources differ sharply in their description of the range of the genus. Robinson has it ranging throughout Africa and occurring also in India and China. Mabberley has it restricted to southeast Africa, Madagascar, and Mauritius.

The genus Distephanus consists of trees, shrubs, and vines. The leaves are often trinervate. The flowers are in terminal inflorescences and are usually yellow. The anthers have an appendage called a tail. The base of the style is enlarged.

The name Distephanus is derived from Greek and means "two crowns", a reference to the two whorls of bristles that form the pappus.

The genus Distephanus was established by Alexandre de Cassini in 1817. Cassini described the type species, Distephanus populifolia in 1819. This species had originally been named Conyza populifolia by Jean-Baptiste Lamarck in 1786.

Distephanus has usually been placed in the tribe Vernonieae, but the results of some molecular phylogenetic studies of DNA sequences have cast doubt upon this placement. In one classification of Asteraceae, it was placed in a tritomy consisting of Distephanus, Moquinieae, and Vernonieae.

Distephanus differs from (other) genera in Vernonieae in having yellow flowers as well as in other characters that are less obvious.

Species
Species include:

References

External links
 Distephanus At: Index Nominum Genericorum At: References At: NMNH Department of Botany At: Research and Collections At: Smithsonian National Museum of Natural History
 Classification (compositae book, chapter 11 At: The International Compositae Alliance
 CRC World Dictionary of Plant Names: D-L At: Botany & Plant Science At: Life Science At: CRC Press

 
Asteraceae genera
Taxonomy articles created by Polbot